Iyas ibn Mu'awiya al-Muzani (full name, Abu Wathila Iyas ibn Mu'awiya ibn Qurra) was a tabi'i Qadi (judge) in the 2nd century AH who lived in Basra (modern day Iraq). He was renowned for possessing immense cleverness which became a favourite topic in Arabic folklore.

Stories of Iyas al-Muzani
 Al-Maydani relates a story about Iyas Al-Muzani, that he once heard a dog bark and declared that the beast was tied to the brink of a well; he judged so because the bark was followed by an echo, caused by the sound being reflected from the bottom of well

Notes

Iyas
8th-century Arabs
Tabi‘un hadith narrators